Sayre is an unincorporated community in Jefferson County, Alabama, United States. Sayre had a post office from October 4, 1904, to November 5, 2011; it still has its own ZIP code, 35139.

References

Unincorporated communities in Jefferson County, Alabama
Unincorporated communities in Alabama